The Nationale Postcode Loterij (National Postcode Lottery) is the biggest charity lottery in the Netherlands. It was founded in 1989 by Novamedia, a marketing agency that sets up and runs charity lotteries. Forty percent of the proceeds of this lottery are donated amongst 81 charities, which, in 2010 amounted to over 270 million euros.

Prize winners are the lot owners whose postal code, a code that forms part of the winners' residential address, has been drawn. Hence even if not participating one may still find out that one would have won had one played. Anticipations of post-decisional regret influence decisions to play the Postcode lottery. Until 2012 it was not even allowed to use the postal code for commercial purposes.  In that year these rules were just abolished by the government.

Ambassadors
Several notable individuals endorse the lottery, and have been appointed ambassadors, including:
 Rafael Nadal, tennis player
 Nelson Mandela
 Bill Clinton, whose Clinton Foundation is a recipient of proceeds from Nationale Postcode Loterij
 Johan Cruyff

Proceeds donated to charities
Figures are in millions of euros:
2000 - 159.0
2001 - 177.1
2002 - 203.3
2003 - 217.4
2004 - 225.2
2005 - 212.5
2006 - 216.7
2007 - 226.0
2008 - 244.4
2009 - 256.5
2011 - 270.5

Charities
Charities receiving proceeds include:

 Amnesty International
 AMREF Flying Doctors
 ARK
 Artsen Zonder Grenzen
 Bellingcat
 BiD Network
 BRAC
 Carbon War Room
 Clinton Foundation
 Cordaid Memisa
 Cordaid Mensen in Nood
 Dance4Life
 DARA (international organization)
 De12Landschappen
 Defence for Children-ECPAT
 De Provinciale Milieufederaties
 De Vrolijkheid
 Dierenbescherming
 Dokters van de Wereld
 Dutch Caribbean Nature Alliance
 European Partnership for Democracy
 Fairfood International
 Fair Trade Original
 Free Voice
 Fundación Rafa Nadal
 The Global Fund
 Goois Natuurreservaat
 Greenpeace
 Hivos
 Humanitas
 Human Rights Watch
 ICCO
 IMC Weekendschool
 IUCN Nederlands Comité
 IVN natuur- en milieueducatie
 Landelijke Vereniging van Wereldwinkels
 Landschapsbeheer Nederland
 Leprastichting
 Liliane Fonds
 Mama Cash
 Milieudefensie
 MYBODY
 Natuurmonumenten
 Nederlandse Rode Kruis
 Nelson Mandela Kinderfonds
 Oranje Fonds
 Oxfam Novib
 
 Peace Parks Foundation
 Plan Nederland
 Postcode Lottery Green Challenge
 Prins Claus Fonds
 Resto VanHarte
 Rocky Mountain Institute
 Save the Children Nederland
 Sea Shepherd Conservation Society
 Simavi
 Skanfonds
 Solidaridad
 SOS Kinder-dorpen
 Stichting AAP
 Stichting Buurtlink
 Stichting DOEN
 Stichting Max Havelaar
 Stichting Natuur en Milieu
 Stichting Vluchteling
 Stichting voor Vluchteling-Studenten UAF
 STOP AIDS NOW!
 Terre des hommes
 The Climate Group
 UNHCR
 UNICEF
 University for Peace
 Vereniging Nederlands ultuurlandschap
 VluchtelingenWerk Nederland
 Vogelbescherming Nederland
 Waddenvereniging
 War Child
 Wereld Natuur Fonds
 World Food Programme

See also
 Miljoenenjacht - Game show from the Nationale Postcode Loterij that eventually was spun off into the global Deal or No Deal television franchise

References

External links

Charities receiving proceeds

Lotteries